Sambalpuri is an Indo-Aryan language variety spoken in western Odisha, India. It is alternatively known as Western Odia, and as Kosali (with variants Kosli, Koshal and Koshali), a recently popularised but controversial term, which draws on an association with the historical region of Dakshina Kosala, whose territories also included the present-day Sambalpur region.

Its speakers usually perceive it as a separate language, while outsiders have seen it as a dialect of Odia, and standard Odia is used by Sambalpuri speakers for formal communication. A 2006 survey of the varieties spoken in four villages found out that they share three-quarters of their basic vocabulary with Standard Odia.

Geographical Distribution 
There were  million people in India who declared their language to be Sambalpuri at the 2011 census, almost all of them residents in Odisha. These speakers were mostly concetrated in the districts of Bargarh ( speakers), Subarnapur, Balangir, Sambalpur, Jharsuguda, Nuapada, Baudh, and Sundargarh.

Script 
The inscriptions and literary works from the Western Odisha region used the Odia script, which is attested through the inscriptions like the Stambeswari stone inscription of 1268 CE laid by the Eastern Ganga monarch Bhanu Deva I at Sonepur and the Meghla grant and Gobindpur charter of Raja Prithvi Sing of Sonepur State and also through the major epic Kosalananda Kavya composed during the 17th century Chauhan rule under Raja Baliar Singh of the Sambalpur State, which was written in Sanskrit in Odia script.

The Devanagari script may have been used in the past, (the Hindi language was mandated in administration and education in Sambalpur for the brief period 18951901)

Phonology 
Sambalpuri has 28 consonant phonemes, 2 semivowel phonemes and 5 vowel phonemes.

There are no long vowels in Sambalpuri just like Standard Odia.

Sambalpuri shows loss of retroflex consonants like retroflex unaspirated nasal(voiced retroflex nasal)  and voiced retroflex lateral approximant  which are present in Standard Odia.

Characteristics 
The following is a list of features and comparison with Standard Odia:

Some key features include-
 r-insertion: insertion or paragogue  of /r/ at the end of Sambalpuri verbs
 Word Medial Vowel Deletion - Syncope of certain word medial vowels, with exceptions seen in -ai diphthongs.
 Vowel Harmony - a shift of /o/ to /u/. This is also seen in the Baleswari Odia dialect and to an extent the Ganjami Odia dialect.
 Word Final Vowel Deletion - Apocope of word-final schwa (see Schwa deletion).

Word Medial Vowel Deletion- Syncope

Exceptions to Word Medial Vowel Deletion- seen in '-ai' diphthongs

Vowel Harmony- 'o' to 'u' phoneme shift, feature also seen in Baleswari Odia dialect

Lengthening of Vowel Sound - vowels which appear in between consonants take their longer counterpart

Consonant shift- shift of  'ṇ' and 'ḷ' phonemes to 'n' and 'l' 

Word Final Vowel Deletion(Schwa deletion Apocope)- a characteristic feature of Sambalpuri

Sambalpuri words

Language movement 
There has been a language movement campaigning for the recognition of the language. Its main objective has been the inclusion of the language into the 8th schedule of the Indian constitution.

Literature 

Satya Narayan Bohidar– writer and pioneer of Sambalpuri literature. Notable works include Ṭikcaham̐rā (1975), Sambalapurī bhāshāra sabda-bibhaba : bā, Saṃkshipta Sambalapurī byākaraṇa o racanā (1977) 
Prayag Dutta Joshi- Sambalpuri writer
Nil Madhab Panigrahi– Wrote Mahabharat Katha
Haldhar Nag– Famous Sambalpuri poet and popularly known as "Lok kabi Ratna". His notable Sambalpuri works are- Lokgeet, Samparda, Krushnaguru, Mahasati Urmila, Tara Mandodari, Achhia, Bacchhar, Siri Somalai, Veer Surendra Sai, Karamsani, Rasia Kavi, Prem Paechan. His works has been compiled into "Lokakabi Haladhar Granthabali" and "Surata". He was awarded the Padma Shri in 2016.
Prafulla Kumar Tripathy– Compiled the Sambalpuri-Odia Dictionary- 'Samalpuri Odia Shabdakosha' (2001). 
Hema Chandra Acharya- Wrote 'Ram Raha' (2001), the Sambalpuri version of the Ramayana.

See also
Sambalpuri culture

References

Bibliography

External links and further reading

Registered newspapers and magazines published in Kosli language

Languages of Odisha
Odia language
Eastern Indo-Aryan languages